Chike or Chiké is an Igbo masculine given name. Notable people with the name include:

Chike (singer) or Chike-Ezekpeazu Osebuka, Nigerian singer, runner up in The Voice Nigeria
Chike Aniakor (born 1939), Nigerian painter
Chike Augustine (born 1992), Trinidad and Tobago basketball player
Chike Lindsay (born 1983), American kickboxer
Chike Nwoffiah (born 1965), Nigerian actor and film director
Chike Obi (1921–2008), Nigerian politician, mathematician and academic
Chike Okeafor (born 1976), American football player
Chike Onyejekwe (born 1986), Romanian handball player
 Chike Ozah (born 1978), black film director, screenwriter, cinematographer, and producer, of duo Coodie & Chike

Masculine given names